Duke Ling of Qi (died 554 BC) was from 581 to 554 BC ruler of the State of Qi, a major power during the Spring and Autumn period of ancient China.  His personal name was Lü Huan (呂環), ancestral name Jiang (姜), and Duke Ling was his posthumous title.  Duke Ling succeeded his father Duke Qing of Qi, who died in 582 BC after 17 years of reign.

Attack from Jin
In 572 BC, Duke Dao of the State of Jin attacked Qi.  Duke Ling made peace with Jin by sending his son Prince Guang (later Duke Zhuang II of Qi) to Jin as a hostage.  Nine years later Prince Guang was made the crown prince of Qi.

Annexing the State of Lai
In 567 BC, the fifteenth year of Duke Ling's reign, the State of Lai attacked Qi but was decisively defeated.  The Qi army counterattacked, killed the Lai ruler Duke Gong, and conquered the entire state.  Lai was a large Dongyi state to the east of Qi, and the state of Qi more than doubled the size of its territory after annexing Lai.

Battle of Pingyin
In 555 BC, Duke Ling switched his alliance from Jin to its enemy State of Chu.  To punish Qi, Duke Ping of Jin invaded and inflicted a crushing defeat on Qi.  The Jin army, led by general Zhonghang Yan, occupied large swathes of Qi territory, besieged the Qi capital Linzi, and burned down the outer portion of the city.  This was the worst defeat that Qi had suffered during the Spring and Autumn period.

Succession
Duke Ling's main wife was Yan Yi Ji, a princess of the State of Lu, who had no son.  His original heir, Crown Prince Guang, was the son of Sheng Ji, niece of Yan Yi Ji.  Duke Ling also had at least two other concubines, Zhong Zi and Rong Zi, who were both princesses of the State of Song.  Zhong Zi bore a son named Ya, while Rong Zi had no son but took Prince Ya under her wing.  Duke Ling favoured Rong Zi, who asked him to make Prince Ya the new crown prince.  Although Zhong Zi objected, Duke Ling still deposed Prince Guang and made Prince Ya his heir.

In 554 BC, the 28th year of his reign, Duke Ling fell ill and died in the fifth month.  The powerful minister Cui Zhu installed Guang, the original crown prince, on the throne, to be known as Duke Zhuang II of Qi.  Cui Zhu and Duke Zhuang killed Rong Zi, Prince Ya, and rival minister Gao Hou, who supported Prince Ya.

Duke Ling also had another son named Chujiu, born to another of Duke Ling's concubines, who was the daughter of Shusun Xuanbo, leader of the Shusun clan of Lu.  Cui Zhu would later kill Duke Zhuang and install Chujiu on the throne, to be known as Duke Jing of Qi.

Family
Wives:
 Yan Yi Ji, of the Ji clan of Lu

Concubines:
 Zong Sheng Ji, of the Ji clan of Lu, Yan Yi Ji's niece; the mother of Crown Prince Guang
 Zhong Zi, of the Zi clan of Song, the mother of Crown Prince Ya
 Rong Zi, of the Zi clan of Song (d. 554 BC), Zhong Ji's dowry younger sister
 Mu Meng Ji, of the Shusun lineage of the Ji clan of Lu, a daughter of Shusun Qiaoru; the mother of Prince Chujiu

Sons:
 Crown Prince Guang (d. 548 BC), ruled as Duke Zhuang II of Qi from 553–548 BC
 Crown Prince Ya (d. 554 BC)
 Prince Chujiu (d. 490 BC), ruled as Duke Jing of Qi from 547–490 BC

Ancestry

References

Year of birth unknown
Monarchs of Qi (state)
6th-century BC Chinese monarchs
554 BC deaths